Mössbauer may refer to:

Rudolf Mössbauer (1929–2011), German physicist
Mössbauer effect, or recoilless nuclear resonance fluorescence
Mössbauer spectroscopy, a spectroscopic technique based on the Mössbauer effect